Charmes-en-l'Angle is a commune in the Haute-Marne department in north-eastern France.

Population

See also
Communes of the Haute-Marne department

References

Charmesenlangle